AleX is an Italian television series.  The series was written by Alfredo Castelli, Guglielmo Duccoli and Giorgio Schottler and produced by Videotime.

See also
List of Italian television series

External links
 

Italian television series
Italia 1 original programming